Henry Fool is a 1997 American black comedy-drama film written, produced and directed by Hal Hartley, featuring Thomas Jay Ryan, James Urbaniak, and Parker Posey. Set like previous Hartley films in less affluent parts of Long Island, it recounts how the lives of a fatherless family are overturned by a mysterious outsider and how, as in The Unbelievable Truth, expectation and reality again conflict.

The film won the best screenplay award at the 1998 Cannes Film Festival. A sequel, titled Fay Grim, was released in 2006. Another sequel, titled Ned Rifle, was released in 2014.

Plot
Socially inept garbage-man Simon Grim is befriended by Henry Fool, a witty rogue and untalented novelist just released from seven years in jail for attempting sex with an underage girl. Henry opens the world of literature to Simon, and inspires him to write "the great American poem." Simon struggles to get his work recognized, and it is often dismissed as pornographic and scatological, but Henry continues to push and inspire Simon to get the poem published.

Henry carries around a bundle of notebooks that he refers to as his "Confession," a work that details aspects of his mysterious past that he one day hopes to publish, when he and the world is ready for them. Henry's hedonistic antics cause all manner of turns in the lives of Simon's family, not least of which is impregnating Fay, Simon's sister.

As Simon begins an ascent to the dizzying heights of Nobel Prize-winning poet, Henry sinks to a life of drinking in low-life bars as his own attempts at fame result in rejection, even by Simon's publisher in whose firm Henry once worked as the janitor. The friends part ways until Henry, trying to save an underage girl abused by her stepfather, kills the man and, helped by Simon, tries to flee the country.

Cast
Thomas Jay Ryan as Henry Fool
James Urbaniak as Simon Grim
Parker Posey as Fay Grim
Liam Aiken as Ned
Maria Porter as Mary
James Saito as Mr. Deng
Kevin Corrigan as Warren
Camille Paglia as herself
Nicholas Hope as Father Hawkes
Toy Connor as Teenager at World Of Donuts

Production
Henry Fool was directed, written, co-produced and composed by Hal Hartley. He began writing the project in the 1980s, and spent years developing and fine-tuning it. Significant writing took place in 1995, and Hartley realized that Henry would be the story's main character, rather than Simon. Hartley wanted the story to incorporate current events, adding elements such as Congressional races and Internet censorship.

The characters of Henry and Simon were partly inspired by the relationship between writers James Joyce and Samuel Beckett. Goethe's Faust was also an inspiration for the film, with Hartley comparing Henry to Mephistopheles. Another inspiration for Henry was John Falstaff, while Hartley compared Simon with Kaspar Hauser. Hartley included gross-out humor, such as vomiting, because he wanted the film to discuss serious topics in a non-academic atmosphere: "I didn't want Henry and Simon to be wearing tweed coats and have Ph.D.s. They needed to be, to a certain degree, disgusting". He said about Henry, "I didn't want it to be too easy to like him. I mean, he's so bombastic, so funny and disgusting -- it's easy just to fall in love with this man. So he really had to have been in prison for something inexcusable". Hartley considered Henry a compelling character because "we never know if he is lying or not".

Hartley chose not to show Simon's poem to the viewer, believing that films about artists "always get it wrong when they show the art. And they let the audience participate in the judgment of the art, whether the art is good or bad". He said that "for the most part, the artistic worth of Simon's poem is not the issue. The issue is the manner in which Simon's life changes as a result of knowing Henry and how that change begins to threaten Henry". The contents of Henry's confession are not specifically discussed either, although Hartley said they are "probably unbelievably pretentious".

Henry Fool marked the film debuts of Thomas Jay Ryan, James Urbaniak, and Liam Aiken. Ryan and Urbaniak were both stage actors. Ryan was cast after Hartley saw him in a play by Richard Foreman called My Head Was a Sledgehammer. Ryan said that Hartley wanted an actor "larger than life, likable, but also patently absurd". Urbaniak had previously appeared in short films made by Hartley. Maria Porter was cast at the suggestion of Ryan, who went to college with her. The role of Ned was narrowed down to three boys, and Aiken won the part because of his natural demeanor.

The start of filming was delayed several times because of financial setbacks, and Ryan had a year and a half to discuss his character with Hartley. Henry's confession is briefly glimpsed in the film, with Ryan's handwriting. Months before the start of production, Hartley gave him a notebook to write in, so it would be ready for filming. The film was produced on a budget of $900,000, a large portion of which went to the rental of camera and sound equipment. Filming took place in 1997, and the shoot lasted three or four weeks. Parker Posey filmed her scenes in four days.

Reception
Based on 28 reviews collected by the film review aggregator Rotten Tomatoes, 89% of critics gave Henry Fool a positive review, with an average rating of 7.42/10. Leonard Maltin gives the film two and a half stars, saying Hartley "just misses the mark".

References

External links
 

1997 films
American drama films
1997 drama films
1997 independent films
American independent films
Films directed by Hal Hartley
Films shot in New York City
Films shot in New Jersey
American avant-garde and experimental films
1990s avant-garde and experimental films
Films about fictional Nobel laureates
Films about writers
1990s English-language films
1990s American films